Patuca is a municipality in the south of the Honduran department of Olancho, east of Juticalpa and south of Catacamas.

It contains the Patuca River which is the second largest in Central America.

Demographics
At the time of the 2013 Honduras census, Patuca municipality had a population of 26,668. Of these, 98.27% were Mestizo, 0.92% White, 0.63% Indigenous, 0.12% Black or Afro-Honduran and 0.06% others.

References

Municipalities of the Olancho Department